Shadow King was an American hard rock supergroup. It was formed in 1990, by former Foreigner lead singer Lou Gramm, future Def Leppard guitarist Vivian Campbell, drummer Kevin Valentine of Donnie Iris and the Cruisers, and bass player Bruce Turgon who later joined Foreigner with Gramm after the split of Shadow King.

Vivian Campbell and Bruce Turgon both also played with Lou Gramm as a solo artist previous to Shadow King, with Campbell playing on Long Hard Look, and Turgon playing on Ready or Not and Long Hard Look.

They released a self-titled album in 1991. Although plans were made for a tour, they performed only once, at the Astoria Theatre in London, England, on December 13, 1991. Rick Seratte (Whitesnake, Foreigner, Poco, Rick Springfield) joined the band for this performance with backup vocals and playing keyboards.  Shortly afterward, Vivian Campbell announced he was leaving Shadow King to join Def Leppard. Although replacements were considered, the band members eventually went their separate ways, with Gramm rejoining Foreigner in 1992 bringing in Turgon along with him.

Discography
Shadow King only had one official studio release, their 1991 eponymous debut album. Although Gramm, Turgon, Campbell and Valentine contributed the song "One Dream" to the Highlander II: The Quickening soundtrack in 1991, the track was officially credited to The Lou Gramm Band.

Shadow King

Shadow King released their self-titled debut album on October 1, 1991, for Atlantic Records. The album was produced by Keith Olsen, who had previously worked with Gramm when he produced Foreigner's Double Vision. The album produced only one single, "I Want You", as well as a music video for the song before they disbanded.

All songs written by Lou Gramm and Bruce Turgon except where noted.

Band members
 Lou Gramm – lead vocals, percussion (1990–1991)
 Vivian Campbell – lead and acoustic guitars, backing vocals, keyboards (1990–1991)
 Bruce Turgon – bass, backing vocals, rhythm guitar, keyboards (1990–1991)
 Kevin Valentine – drums, backing vocals (1990–1991)

References

External links
Biography

Hard rock musical groups from California
Musical groups from Los Angeles
Musical groups established in 1990
Musical groups disestablished in 1992